Roccapreturo is a frazione of Acciano, in the Province of L'Aquila in the Abruzzo, region of Italy.

Frazioni of the Province of L'Aquila
Acciano

it:Roccapreturo